Georges Rolot (10 May 1889 – 31 December 1977) was a French sprinter. He competed in the men's 100 metres at the 1912 Summer Olympics.

References

1889 births
1977 deaths
Athletes (track and field) at the 1912 Summer Olympics
French male sprinters
Olympic athletes of France
Place of birth missing